Seoul Evita is 1991 South Korean musical romantic film

Plot
A love story of Student activist and musical student who shared apartment.

Cast
Hwang Shin-hye ... Lee Seon-yeong
Park Sang-won ... Kim Min-su 
Jo Yeong-nam
Jung Hye-sun 
Oh Seung-myeong 
Kim Seok-ok 
Kim Eun-suk 
Lee Ho-seong 
Jeong Woon-bong 
Kim Deok-nam  
Ahn Jong-hwan

External links
 
 

1992 films
South Korean romantic drama films
1990s musical drama films
Films directed by Park Chul-soo
South Korean musical drama films
1990s romantic musical films
1991 drama films
1991 films
1992 drama films